Virgin Money UK plc is a holding company that owns Clydesdale Bank plc, which in turn trades as Clydesdale Bank, Yorkshire Bank and Virgin Money in the United Kingdom. It was formed as CYBG plc by National Australia Bank (NAB) in February 2016, in advance of the divestment of its UK business through a stock market flotation. It is listed on the London Stock Exchange and Australian Securities Exchange; it is also a constituent of the FTSE 250 Index.

History

Formation of CYBG plc
National Australia Bank acquired Clydesdale Bank in 1987 and Yorkshire Bank in 1995. Fred Goodwin, an accountant working for Touche Ross, worked on the acquisition of Clydesdale Bank. In 1995 Goodwin, with little direct banking experience, was appointed deputy CEO of the Clydesdale Bank. Clydesdale Bank and Yorkshire Bank began operating under a single banking licence in the UK in 2005: Yorkshire Bank became a division of Clydesdale Bank but retained its own name for trading purposes.

National Australia Bank confirmed in October 2014 that it planned to exit the UK, and was considering a number of options for Yorkshire Bank and Clydesdale Bank, including a possible stock market listing. Clydesdale Bank and Yorkshire Bank were demerged and placed in a separate holding company, CYBG plc, which was listed on the London Stock Exchange and Australian Securities Exchange for conditional share trading on 3 February 2016 and unconditional trading from 8 February 2016.

Acquisition of Virgin Money
On 7 May 2018 it was reported that CYBG plc had made a £1.7bn all share offer to acquire Virgin Money plc. On 18 June 2018 it was announced that the takeover had been agreed. Arrangements were made for CYBG to license the Virgin Money brand for £12 million a year (later rising to £15 million a year) and to move all its retail customers to the Virgin Money brand over the following three years. The acquisition of Virgin Money plc was completed on 15 October 2018. The assets of Virgin Money plc were legally merged into Clydesdale Bank plc on 21 October 2019.

Rebrand to Virgin Money UK plc
The group's name was changed from CYBG plc to Virgin Money UK plc on 31 October 2019.

CEO David Duffy's pay rose by 84% from £1.8m in 2018 to £3.4m in 2019. This was despite an investor revolt in which a third of shareholders opposed the payout, citing the fact that company had suffered its second consecutive annual loss, caused by a £385m charge for mis-sold payment protection insurance. Duffy's increase was largely due to a bonus of £1.3m linked to the 2015 demerger of Virgin Money's predecessor bank, CYBG, from National Australia Bank, as well as incentives from 2016.

Operations

The registered office is in Newcastle upon Tyne, where the Virgin Money UK division is headquartered. The B, Clydesdale Bank, and Yorkshire Bank brands are in the process of being phased out in favour of the Virgin Money brand.

See also

References

External links
 
Virgin Money Careers

Holding companies of the United Kingdom
Holding companies established in 2016
British companies established in 2016
National Australia Bank
Companies listed on the Australian Securities Exchange
Companies listed on the London Stock Exchange